What Planet Are You From? is a 2000 American science fiction comedy film directed by Mike Nichols and written by Michael Leeson, Garry Shandling, Ed Solomon, and Peter Tolan based on a story by Leeson and Shandling. The film stars Shandling, Annette Bening, Greg Kinnear, Ben Kingsley, Linda Fiorentino, and John Goodman.

Plot
A denizen (Garry Shandling) of a faraway planet occupied only by highly evolved males is ordered by his superior, Graydon (Ben Kingsley), to find a female human, impregnate her and bring the baby back to the planet.

The visitor to Earth ends up in Phoenix, Arizona, where he assumes the name Harold Anderson and takes a job in a bank. There he meets a  womanizing co-worker Perry Gordon (Greg Kinnear), who goes to Alcoholics Anonymous meetings strictly to meet women. Harold accompanies him to one and meets Susan (Annette Bening), a recovering alcoholic.

He must marry her before he can try to mate. After their wedding in Las Vegas, Susan finds herself wildly satisfied by Harold, even though men from his planet have no genitals and he has been equipped for his Earth visit with a penis that makes a loud whirring sound whenever he gets an erection.

Harold and Susan have a difficult time conceiving a baby. Meanwhile, Roland Jones (John Goodman), an employee of the FAA who learned of Harold's odd behavior on an airplane, has become obsessed with proving him to be an alien and being the first one to find him.

When the child is born, Harold, following orders, abandons his wife and returns to his planet, but his sadness over hurting Susan leaves him with guilt and second thoughts even though people from his world theoretically have no emotions, so against the wishes of Graydon, he returns the baby to Susan and tells her the truth.  Susan is angry, grateful, and completely disbelieving.  Harold offers to prove that he is in fact an alien and does so just as Roland arrives, viewing Harold's "act of proof" through the window.  Instead of forgiving him and welcoming him back into their relationship, Susan breaks down in tears, saying, "I thought I had things right but then I married an alien!"  Harold leaves.

Once outside, Harold sees Roland, who is delighted to know he was right all along about Harold being an alien. Roland implores Harold to come with him and admit this to his wife, who doesn't believe him about Harold. Harold charitably agrees, but before that can happen, Graydon shows up with a phaser. Holding Harold at gunpoint, he declares he's taking Harold back. Roland pulls his gun on the leader, who brags, "none of your primitive weapons can hurt me, and I can heal instantly from anything," and shoots him in the chest. Graydon falls dead into the fountain.

Susan comes outside and says she thinks they should try to patch things up after all. Roland happily walks off with Graydon's alien body. Susan and Harold retake their vows in the wedding she says she always wanted. On the drive home, he tells her that the citizens of his planet want him to take over as leader. They discuss it, but she doesn't want to move since all her friends are here, and she knows nothing about the school system there. Harold grudgingly agrees to make the very long commute.

Cast

 Garry Shandling as Harold Anderson
 Annette Bening as Susan Anderson
 Greg Kinnear as Perry Gordon
 Ben Kingsley as Graydon
 Linda Fiorentino as Helen Gordon
 John Goodman as Roland Jones
 Judy Greer as Rebecca
 Danny Zorn as Randy
 Harmony Smith as Rita
 Richard Jenkins as Don Fisk
 Caroline Aaron as Nadine Jones
 Nora Dunn as Madeline
 Cricky Long as Janice
 Camryn Manheim as Alison
 Ann Cusack as Liz
 Phill Lewis as Other MD
 Janeane Garofalo as upset airline passenger
 Octavia Spencer as baby nurse

Production
Shandling set up the film while starring in HBO’s The Larry Sanders Show with initial drafts written by Ed Solomon and Michael Leeson, before a rewrite was performed by Shandling and his former “Sanders” producer Peter Tolan.

In December 1998, it was announced Mike Nichols had entered negotiations to direct the film.

Release
What Planet Are You From? opened theatrically on March 3, 2000, in 2,248 venues, earning $3,008,746 in its first weekend and ranking fourteenth in the North American box office. The film ended its run, having grossed $6,291,602 domestically and $7,854,075 overseas for a worldwide total of $14,145,677. Based on a $60 million budget, the film was a box office bomb.

Reception

The film holds a 42% score on Rotten Tomatoes based on 77 reviews and average rating of 5.01/10. The site's consensus states: "Though What Planet Are You From? has some laughs, it's too inconsistent and bland for critics to give it their recommendations." Metacritic reports a 41 out of 100 rating based on 32 critics, indicating "mixed or average reviews".

References

External links
 
 
 
 

2000 films
2000s sex comedy films
2000s science fiction comedy films
2000 science fiction films
American science fiction comedy films
American sex comedy films
Alien invasions in films
2000s English-language films
Films set in Arizona
Films shot in California
Films shot in the Las Vegas Valley
Films shot in Los Angeles
Columbia Pictures films
Films scored by Carter Burwell
Films directed by Mike Nichols
Films with screenplays by Ed Solomon
Films with screenplays by Peter Tolan
2000 comedy films
2000s American films